Adrian Mannarino took the title, defeating Adrián Menéndez-Maceiras 6–3, 6–0

Seeds

Draw

Finals

Top half

Bottom half

References
 Main Draw
 Qualifying Draw

Singles
Open Castilla y León singles
2014 ATP Challenger Tour